Blackhall Colliery railway station served the village of Blackhall Colliery in County Durham, North East England.

History
This line was built, primarily, to avoid the steep gradients of the inland route at Ryhope Bank and Hesleden but also provided access to the newly developed collieries along the Durham Coast.

However, when the line was opened, the NER chose to build the station to serve the Blackhalls at what became Blackhall Rocks as sinking of the colliery at Blackhall did not begin until 1909 and thus the main traffic that was expected to use the station was that of tourists visiting the caves at Blackhall Rocks. This meant that the village that developed to serve the colliery was left some distance from their nearest railway station.

Eventually, the London and North Eastern Railway (LNER), who had absorbed the NER in 1923, agreed to open an additional station to serve Blackhall Colliery. Construction of the station began on 6 July 1936 and was opened, just 18 days later, on 24 July 1936 by the then manager of Blackhall Colliery and county councillor Ernest Chicken who then proceeded to purchase the first ticket from the station ticket office.

Passenger services continue pass through the site of the station but run non-stop between Seaham and Hartlepool.

References

External links

Disused railway stations in County Durham
Railway stations in Great Britain opened in 1936
Railway stations in Great Britain closed in 1964
Beeching closures in England
Former London and North Eastern Railway stations